Alexander Duncan Langmuir (12 September 1910 – 22 November 1993) was an American epidemiologist. He is renowned for creating the Epidemic Intelligence Service.

Biography

Alexander D. Langmuir was born in Santa Monica, California. He received his A.B. in 1931 from Harvard, his M.D. in 1935 from Cornell University Medical College, and his M.P.H. in 1940 from the Johns Hopkins School of Hygiene and Public Health. After serving as a public health officer in New York and as an epidemiologist with the U. S. Army from 1942 to 1946, Langmuir returned to Johns Hopkins to become associate professor of epidemiology in the school of medicine. In 1949, he became director of the epidemiology branch of the National Communicable Disease Center (now the Centers for Disease Control and Prevention) in Atlanta, a position he held for over 20 years. He wrote extensively on all phases of epidemiology on a global basis and was recognized internationally as a leading contributor in epidemiology. Langmuir was a visiting professor at the Johns Hopkins School of Hygiene and Public Health from 1988 until his death in 1993.

References

External links
 The Alexander D. Langmuir Collection Alan Mason Chesney Medical Archives of the Johns Hopkins Medical Institutions
 The Alexander D. Langmuir papers can be found at The Center for the History of Medicine at the Countway Library, Harvard Medical School.

1910 births
1993 deaths
American atheists
American public health doctors
Harvard University alumni
Weill Cornell Medical College alumni
Johns Hopkins Bloomberg School of Public Health alumni
20th-century American biologists
Members of the American Epidemiological Society
Physician-scientists
20th-century American physicians
Physicians from California
People from Santa Monica, California